This is a list of subdivisions of Wales by the percentage of those professing some skills in the Welsh language in the 2011 UK census. The census did not record Welsh-speakers living outside Wales.

The census determined that 18.56% of the population could speak Welsh and 14.57% could speak, read and write in the language. The most recent Annual Population Survey (June 2020), as conducted by the Office for National Statistics, suggests that 28.6% of people in Wales aged three and over were able to speak Welsh.

Census breakdown
The Census produced a detailed breakdown of skills as: 
Understands spoken Welsh (no other skills)
Speaks but does not read or write Welsh
Speaks and reads but does not write Welsh
Speaks, reads and writes Welsh
Other combination of skills; e.g. Can read but not speak.
No knowledge of Welsh.

Those with knowledge of the Welsh language
For the purpose of the first table, all combinations other than "no knowledge of Welsh" have been combined, giving a percentage of people that state they have some communication skills in the Welsh language rather than an ability to speak Welsh. The totals include children whose parents have filled in the Census details on this behalf

Those with the ability to speak Welsh
The second table includes only those people who stated in the 2011 Census that they are able to speak the Welsh language. It was these statistics that were reported by the press when the first data samples were released in 2012.

Annual Population Survey estimates

In addition to official Census data, the Annual Population Survey publishes sample-based estimates on the number of self-proclaimed Welsh speakers several times a year based on estimates for the previous year. The third table displays uses this data to show estimates for the percentage of people who say they can speak Welsh at the time of each survey, from June 2016 onwards.

{|
|

See also
Irish language in Northern Ireland
List of Scottish council areas by number of Scottish Gaelic speakers
List of Welsh principal areas

References

External links
 

Welsh language

Demographics of Wales
Principal areas by percentage Welsh language